Sureddipalem is a village in K.Kotapadu and Sabbavaram Mandal in the Anakapalli district of Andhra Pradesh, India.

The population of Sureddipalem(kotapadu) is 890.
Sabbavaram sureddipalem is a village near amruthapuram

Villages in Anakapalli  district